Eve 6 is the debut studio album by American alternative rock band Eve 6. The album was produced by Don Gilmore and released on April 28, 1998 by RCA Records.

Reception
"Inside Out" quickly rose to the number 1 spot on the Modern Rock charts and topping Billboard's Heatseekers new artists chart. It went platinum, receiving a boost from MTV play of videos for "Inside Out" and "Leech". A video was also made for "Tongue Tied", which featured a young Katie Holmes and Marisa Coughlan from the film Teaching Mrs. Tingle.

Track listing

Personnel
Credits adapted from Barnes and Noble.

Performance
 Don Gilmore – background vocals
 Max Collins – bass guitar, vocals
 Tony Fagenson – drums, percussion
 Jonathan Siebels – guitar, background vocals

Technical
 Don Gilmore – producer, engineer, mixer
 Stephen Marcussen- mastering
 Don C. Taylor- digital editing
 Billy Bowers- assistant engineer
 John Burton- assistant engineer
 Zach Belica- assistant engineer
 John Seymour- assistant engineer
 Doug Trantow- assistant engineer
 Jason Martin – artist development
 Jonathan Rosen – illustrations
 Brett Kilroe – art direction
 Julie Bruzzone – artist development

Charts

Weekly charts

Year-end charts

Certifications

References

External links
Eve 6 discography

1998 debut albums
Eve 6 albums
RCA Records albums